Elizabeth Darling may refer to:

Elizabeth Darling, author of Britain Can Make It
Bessie Darling, American socialite and murder victim
Elizabeth Darling, Author of AA Women in Architecture
Eliza, Lady Darling (1798–1898), British philanthropist and artist, wife of Sir Ralph Darling